Sport in France plays an important role in French society, which is reflected in its popularity among the French people and the nation's strong sporting history. Various types of sports are played and followed in France, notably cycling, football, and handball, which has earned France eight victories in world championships and five Olympic medals. France is also the three-time European champion of handball.

Main sports

Football

Football (soccer) is the most popular sport in France, with 1,993,270 licensed players in the leagues. The sport was imported from England at the end of the 19th century, under the name of association football. In its early days, the sport gained followers mainly in the Paris area and the Northern part of the country - Nord-Pas-de-Calais and Normandy were the first teams that were created outside Paris. However, in southern France, football's competitor, rugby football, was more popular for a period of time. Established in 1919 from competing organizations, the Fédération française de football consists of 18,000 teams.

France is also one of only ten teams to have won the UEFA European Championship (1984 and 2000). They also finished as runners-up when they hosted the tournament in 2016. France was also the 1984 Olympic Champion and the 1998 and 2018 FIFA World Cup winner, hosting the 1998 tournament. They finished as World Cup runners-up in 2006 and 2022.

Ligue 1 is the French professional league for association football clubs. It is the country's primary football competition and serves as the top division of the French football league system. Contested by 20 clubs, it operates on a system of promotion and relegation with Ligue 2. The most successful clubs in the French first division history are Paris Saint-Germain and AS Saint-Étienne with 10 championships each (the latter's last one in 1981), followed by Olympique de Marseille with 9 titles and FC Nantes with 8 titles. As of 2022, the current champions are Paris Saint-Germain.

The Coupe de France is the premier knock-out cup competition in French football. The Coupe de la Ligue is the second major cup competition in France. The Trophée des Champions is played each July as a one-off match between the Coupe de France winners and the Ligue 1 champions.

Only one French club, Olympique de Marseille, has won the UEFA Champions League, in 1993. Stade de Reims (1956, 1959), Saint-Étienne (1976), AS Monaco (2004) and Paris Saint-Germain (2020) have been runners-up.

SC Bastia (1978), FC Girondins de Bordeaux (1996) and Olympique de Marseille (1999, 2004, 2018) have also been runners-up in the UEFA Europa League.

The France women's national football team's main international achievement has been fourth place at the 2011 FIFA Women's World Cup. They also hosted the 2019 Women's World Cup.

Women's national professional competitions are supervised by the Fédération française de football. The first division is the Championnat de France de football féminin. Olympique Lyonnais is the most successful team in French first division history with 26 national titles, including a streak of fourteen consecutive league titles from 2007 to 2020. In the UEFA Women's Champions League, OL have won a record eight titles (2011, 2012, 2016, 2017, 2018, 2019, 2020 and 2022) and have been runners-up twice (2010 and 2013).

Basketball

The France national basketball team has had good results in international competitions over the years, with the senior team winning their first title ever at the EuroBasket 2013. The team was runner-up at the 1948 Summer Olympics, EuroBasket 1949, the 2000 Summer Olympics, the EuroBasket 2011, and the 2020 Summer Olympics. France has also won medals at the FIBA World Cup in 2014, and 2019.

Ten are currently playing, most notably San Antonio Spurs point guard Parker, with four NBA titles to his credit; Spurs forward Diaw; Utah Jazz center Rudy Gobert, who won back-to-back NBA Defensive Player of the Year awards in 2018 and 2019; and New York Knicks forward-center Joakim Noah, also notable for his college career at the University of Florida in which he starred on a team that won two NCAA titles with the same starting lineup. The New York Knicks former GM Phil Jackson selected Frank Ntilikina in the 2016-2017 NBA Draft.

Men's national professional competitions are supervised by the Ligue Nationale de Basketball. There are two divisions: Pro A (first division) and Pro B (second division). ASVEL Lyon-Villeurbanne is the most successful team in French first division history with 17 titles from 1949 to 2009. Limoges CSP is the only French team to have won the EuroLeague in 1993.

The France women's national basketball team has twice been European champion (2001 and 2009), and also claimed a silver medal at the 2012 Summer Olympics.

Women's national professional competitions are supervised by the Fédération Française de Basket-Ball with the first division being the Ligue féminine de basket. Clermont Université Club is the most successful team in French first division history with 13 titles from 1968 to 1981. CJM Bourges (1997, 1998, and 2001) and US Valenciennes (2002 and 2004) have won the EuroLeague Women.

Besides regular basketball, 3x3 basketball has become increasingly popular in France.

Rugby union

Rugby union  (rugby à 15 or jeu à 15) was first introduced in the early 1870s by British residents. While football is much more popular nationally, rugby union is predominant in the southern half of the country, especially around Toulouse, the French Basque country and Catalonia. Elite French clubs participate in the domestic club competition - the Top 14. Clubs also compete in the European knock-out competitions, the European Rugby Champions Cup and European Rugby Challenge Cup. It is the seventh largest French team sport in the terms of licensed players with 360,847 licensed players (2014). There are 1,737 clubs in France and the number of licensed players has significantly increased over the recent years (up from 260,000 in 2000).

In 2010, the all-French final of the Heineken Cup between Toulouse and Biarritz in the Stade de France received 3.2 million viewers on France 2. In 2011, the final of the Top 14 gathered 4.4 million viewers on France 2 and Canal+ and the World Cup final between New Zealand and France gathered 15.4 million viewers on TF1, the highest audience on French TV since the start of the year.

The national side is one of the tier 1 national teams. It competes annually in the Six Nations Championship, and won it outright 16 times. France has been to every Rugby World Cup since its inception in 1987, and has been a runner-up on three occasions, most recently in 2011. France hosted the 2007 Rugby World Cup.

Handball

There were 492,101 licensed handball players in France as of 2019.

The France men's national handball team is the first handball team to have held all three titles twice (the Danish women's team also held all three in 1997), and the only national team in its sport to hold six world titles and a total of eleven medals at the World Men's Handball Championship. With a total of five medals, including three gold in 2008, 2012 and 2021, France is also the most successful handball team at the Summer Olympics. France was also recognized as the European champion of handball in 2006, 2010 and 2014.

The France women's national handball team, although less successful, won the Summer Olympics once (2020), the World Championship twice (2003, 2017) and also the European Championship once (2018).

Men's national professional competitions are supervised by the Ligue nationale de handball with the top division being the LNH Division 1. Montpellier Handball is the most successful team in French first division history, with 14 titles from 1995 to 2012. With 8 titles between 2013 and 2021, Paris Saint-Germain Handball is the current top club. Nevertheless, Montpellier Handball is still the only French team to have won the EHF Champions League, in 2003 and in 2018.

Women's main national professional competition is the LFH Division 1 Féminine. Metz Handball is the most successful team in French first division history with 23 titles from 1989 to 2019. One French team, Brest Bretagne Handball, has reached the final at the EHF Women's Champions League, in 2021.

Cycling

France hosts "the world's biggest annual sporting event" called the Tour de France, a road cycling race, which takes place each July and lasts for three weeks. It is one of the three Grand Tours, which are the most prestigious stage races in road cycling. The Tour has been won 36 times by French cyclists in its 110-year history. Cycling is very popular in France, evident from the fact that the race of Tour de France attracts more than 12 million people who travel to witness the race first hand. The Tour de France also attracts a television audience of 3.5 billion people worldwide. In addition, the north of France hosts the one-day race Paris–Roubaix, known as one of the cobbled classics famous for the use of cobblestones or setts as challenging terrain, and as one of the five "Monuments" which along with the road racing World Championship are the most important one-day classic cycle races. Other high-profile races which are included as part of the top-level UCI World Tour circuit include the stage races Paris–Nice and the Critérium du Dauphiné (often used as a warm-up race for riders competing in the Tour de France), and the one-day race GP Ouest-France.

Some of the most notable French riders are multiple Grand Tour winners Lucien Petit-Breton, André Leducq, Antonin Magne, Louison Bobet, Jacques Anquetil (along with historic contender Raymond Poulidor, who was a favorite of the crowd), Roger Pingeon, Bernard Thévenet, Bernard Hinault and Laurent Fignon, and multiple Monument winners Maurice Garin, Lucien Lesna, Hippolyte Aucouturier, Octave Lapize, Gustave Garrigou, Henri Pélissier, Charles Crupelandt, Jean Forestier, Gilbert Duclos-Lassalle and Laurent Jalabert. In women's cycling Jeannie Longo is one of the most successful competitors of all time, having won the Tour de France Feminin three times, nine gold medals in road racing and time trialling at the UCI Road World Championships, and the gold in the road race at the 1996 Olympics.

Ice hockey

Ice hockey is a fairly popular sport in France, especially in the Rhône-Alpes region and in the cities of Rouen, Amiens and Tours. The governing body is the FFHG which administers the national championship, Ligue Magnus (founded in 1907). The national team is currently ranked in the top 20 in the IIHF World Ranking. In recent years, numerous French ice hockey players have played in the NHL, the premier ice hockey competition on the planet based in the United States and Canada, including Stanley Cup winner Cristobal Huet and Vancouver Canucks forward Antoine Roussel.

Judo

Judo is the fourth most popular sport in France. Teddy Riner, with ten World Championship gold medals and three Olympic gold medals, is one of the most successful French judoka.

Motorsports

Motorsports are very popular in France, especially auto racing and motorcycle racing.

Formula One has a strong connection with and long history in France, having roots in European Grand Prix motor racing, which traces its birth to the 1906 French Grand Prix. Many French circuits have been used since the foundation of the Formula One Championships: Reims-Gueux (1950–1966), Rouen-Les-Essarts (1952–1958), Circuit Charade (1965–1972), Bugatti Circuit (1967), Circuit Paul Ricard (1971–), Dijon-Prenois (1974–1984), and Circuit de Nevers Magny-Cours (1991–2008).
France is home of Formula One World's Constructors' Champions Matra (1969) and Renault (2005 and 2006), and Formula One World Drivers' Champion Alain Prost (1985, 1986, 1989, and 1993). The most recent French Formula One race winner is Esteban Ocon, having won the 2021 Hungarian Grand Prix while racing for Alpine.

France is also home to the most Champions in Formula Two history with Jean-Pierre Beltoise, Johnny Servoz-Gavin, Jean-Pierre Jarier, Patrick Depailler, Jacques Laffite, Jean-Pierre Jabouille, and René Arnoux. France produced five champions in the International Formula 3000 championship, the successor to the European F2 series: Jean Alesi (1989), Érik Comas (1990), Olivier Panis (1993), Jean-Christophe Boullion (1994) and Sébastien Bourdais (2002), tying with Italy as the most successful nation in the formula. Romain Grosjean won the GP2 Asia Series in 2008 and 2011 and the main GP2 Series in 2011, whilst Pierre Gasly won the GP2 title in the series' final season in 2016.

Touring car racing, although less popular in France than Formula One, has a strong following, especially with four time World Touring Car Championship Drivers' Champion Yvan Muller (2008, 2010, 2011 and 2013).
In Sports car racing, France is home to the 24 Hours of Le Mans the world's oldest sports car race in endurance racing, held annually since 1923. Also, French auto racing team Hexis Racing is the current FIA GT1 World Team Champion.

Rallying is very popular in France, with two World Rally Championship rallies being held there: Tour de Corse (1973–2008) and Rallye d'Alsace (2010-today).

French drivers and manufacturers have been very successful in the World Rally Championship, especially since 2000, winning 14 championships in each competition. Champions include Didier Auriol (1994), Sébastien Loeb (2004, 2005, 2006, 2007, 2008, 2009, 2010, 2011 and 2012, an all-time record) and Sébastien Ogier (2013, 2014, 2015, 2016,2017 and 2018) for the drivers, and Alpine (1973), Peugeot (1985, 1986, 2000, 2001, and 2002), and Citroën (2003, 2004, 2005, 2008, 2009, 2010, 2011, 2012) for the manufacturers.

France holds an annual ice racing championship at the end of each year, called the Andros Trophy.

Other types of auto racing (Stock car racing, Sports car racing, Drag racing, etc.) are more favoured.

France host the French motorcycle Grand Prix currently in Le Mans. 

Fabio Quartararo is the first French to win the premier class of MotogGP in 2021. Also, in Superbike World Championship only two French riders have been champions: Raymond Roche in 1990 and Sylvain Guintoli in 2014.

Orienteering
Orienteering is a reasonably popular sport in France; it is regulated by the Fédération Française de Course d'Orientation (FFCO)
.

Pétanque
Pétanque is mostly played and highly popular in the South of France. Pétanque is not considered a sport by many northern Frenchmen, though the sport is internationally recognized by the IOC.
Professional players play the competitive form of Pétanque, which is called Pétanque Sport, under precise rules. The competitive form is played by about 480,000 persons licensed with the Federation Française de Pétanque et Jeu Provençal (FFOJP). The FFPJP is the 4th largest sports federation in France.

Rugby league

Rugby league (rugby à treize) has been played in France since the 1930s, and is most popular, like rugby union, in the south of the country. The sport arguably achieved its height in popularity in the 1950s and 1960s when the France national team made it to World Cup finals and won test series against Australia, Great Britain and New Zealand.  Two French-based teams, the Catalans Dragons and Toulouse Olympique, participate in the Super League tournament, which has helped boost the sport's profile and led to growth in player numbers.

Sailing

Professional sailing in France is centered on singlehanded/shorthanded ocean racing with the pinnacle of this branch of the sport being the Vendée Globe singlehanded around the world race which starts every 4 years from the French Atlantic.

Skiing
Skiing is a popular sport in France. The best places for skiing are the mountainous areas in the south, center, and east of the country, where most French ski resorts are located.

Émile Allais won four World Championship golds in the 1930s. Henri Oreiller won Olympic gold at the 1948 Winter Olympics. Jean-Claude Killy dominated alpine skiing in the late 1960s, winning all three alpine skiing golds on offer at the 1968 Winter Olympics on French snow in Grenoble. These events also served as the 1968 Alpine Skiing World Championships, and in addition, Killy won the World Championship Combined event in 1968 to add to golds in the Downhill and Combined won at the 1966 World Championships. He also won the first two overall Alpine Skiing World Cup titles. Marielle Goitschel won two Olympic golds, an additional five World Championship golds and three discipline World Cup titles in the 1960s. Guy Périllat was a double World Championship gold medalist in the 1960s. Fabienne Serrat won two golds at the 1974 World Championships. More recently Luc Alphand won the overall World Cup in 1997 and four discipline titles in Downhill and Super Giant Slalom. Jean-Baptiste Grange was Slalom World Cup champion in 2009 and Slalom World Champion in 2011 and 2015. In January 2017 Alexis Pinturault set a new record for World Cup wins by a French skier when he took his 19th victory in a giant slalom in Adelboden, breaking Jean-Claude Killy's record.

French success in cross-country skiing has been somewhat more limited. However Vincent Vittoz did win a gold medal in the 15 km + 15 km double pursuit at the FIS Nordic World Ski Championships in 2005. He also finished as runner up in the Distance World Cup for three consecutive seasons from 2004/05 to 2006/07.

Jason Lamy-Chappuis has been an extremely successful competitor in Nordic combined. He won a gold medal in the Individual normal hill/10 km competition at the 2010 Winter Olympics as well as four World Championship golds and three consecutive FIS Nordic Combined World Cups between 2009/10 and 2011/12.

France has enjoyed success in Biathlon in recent years. Raphaël Poirée won seven Biathlon World Championship golds and four overall Biathlon World Cups. He is the joint second most successful male biathlete of all time in terms of winning overall World Cup titles, and scored 44 World Cup victories. Martin Fourcade has won 13 World Championship golds, 7 overall World Cup titles 1 silver medal in Vancouver 2010 Olympic Games, 2 gold medals in the Sochi 2014 Olympic Games, and 3 golf medals in the Pyeongchang 2018 Olympic Games.

Tennis

Tennis is the second most popular French sport in terms of the number of licensed players with 1,111,316 licensed tennis players in France (2012).

France holds the tennis Grand Slam tournament Roland Garros.  As of February 20, 2017, the current male and female French no. 1 players are Richard Gasquet and Caroline Garcia, respectively. Some other French current stars include Gaël Monfils, Gilles Simon, Lucas Pouille, Alizé Cornet, and Kristina Mladenovic.  Other stars from the past include Yannick Noah (father of Joakim Noah), Guy Forget, Henri Leconte, Amélie Mauresmo, Mary Pierce and Marion Bartoli.

Minor team sports

American Football

The Ligue Élite de Football Américain, founded in 1982, is the top level of American football in France.

Australian rules football

Australian rules football is a growing sport in France, with the first clubs forming in the 1990s. There are several clubs around the country forming a "Super League" and some other clubs playing in a developmental league. There is a national men's Australian Football team that has played international matches and competes in the Australian Football International Cup, which is essentially a World Cup for all countries apart from Australia.

Baseball

Baseball is a minor sport in France.

Cricket
Cricket is a developing sport in France. Some reports claim that cricket was invented in France, however, the sport is relatively unknown due to inadequate media coverage. In fact, the 1900 Olympic games, the only one where cricket was played, featured bitter rivals England and France taking on each other. A rematch of the two teams took place just before the 2012 Olympics.

Gaelic football
Though it is little known, Gaelic football is developing in France.  There are currently 20 clubs across the country, with 80% of the players being French.

Lacrosse
The France national lacrosse team has qualified for the World Lacrosse Championship three consecutive times, in 2010 through 2018. At the most recent event (2018), it finished 33rd out of 46.

Beach volleyball
France's men's national team in beach volleyball that competed at the 2018–2020 CEV Beach Volleyball Continental Cup.

See also
 Brevet d'État d'éducateur sportif
 Union des Sociétés Françaises de Sports Athlétiques
 Minister of Youth Affairs and Sports (France)

References

Further reading
 Holt, R. "Women, men and sport in France, c. 1870–1914: An introductory survey," Journal of Sport History (1991)
 Krasnoff, Lindsay Sarah. The Making of "Les Bleus": Sport in France, 1958-2010 (Lexington Books; 2012) 214 pages; examines the politics of the French state's efforts to create elite athletes in football and basketball at the youth level.
 Terret, Thierry. "Is there a French sport history? Reflections on French sport historiography." International Journal of the History of Sport 28.14 (2011): 2061-2084.
 Weber, Eugen. "Gymnastics and sport in fin de siècle France", American Historical Review 76 (1971)